Marc Burch (born May 7, 1984 in Cincinnati, Ohio) is an American soccer player.

Career

College and amateur
Burch played college soccer at the University of Evansville for three seasons from 2002–2004, scoring seven goals and assisting on 22 along the way, and spent the summer months playing for the Cleveland Internationals in the USL Premier Development League. After the 2004 season he transferred to the University of Maryland, where he would become a crucial member of the Terrapin squad that won the College Cup, even scoring the game-winning goal in the championship against New Mexico.

Professional
Burch was drafted in the second round, 24th overall, by Los Angeles Galaxy in the 2006 MLS SuperDraft. On July 11, 2006, Burch was traded from Galaxy after appearing in only 3 games. He was sent to Columbus Crew for a second-round pick in the 2007 MLS Supplemental Draft. Burch was traded again on April 4, 2007 to D.C. United for a third-round 2008 MLS Supplemental Draft pick. There he was converted from a striker to a left back.

He scored his first professional goal against Toronto FC on September 29, 2007 in a 4–1 win for D.C.  In 2008, he scored both goals from 2 free kicks in a 2–0 win for D.C. over Rochester Raging Rhinos in the 2008 U.S. Open Cup third round. It has been pointed out by D.C. United broadcaster Thomas Rongen that Marc Burch "serves great balls" from his position as a left back/left midfielder in D.C. United's formation.

Burch remained with D.C. through the 2011 season. At season's end, the club declined his 2012 contract option and he entered the 2011 MLS Re-Entry Draft. On December 12, 2011, Seattle Sounders FC selected Burch with the first pick of stage two of the Re-Entry Draft. On January 3, 2012, he signed with the Sounders.

On November 10, 2012 MLS Commissioner Don Garber suspended Burch for three games and fined him an undisclosed amount for using unacceptable and offensive language toward Will Johnson in a playoff game against Real Salt Lake. Burch had been caught on camera appearing to use homophobic language towards Johnson. Garber also ordered Burch to attend diversity and sensitivity training. Burch sat out the two-game Western Conference finals games against the Los Angeles Galaxy. Burch quickly issued an apology through Facebook as well as the official Seattle Sounders site.

Following the 2013 season Seattle cut ties with Burch. In December 2013, he was selected by Colorado Rapids in stage one of the 2013 MLS Re-Entry Draft.

On March 31, 2017 Burch and Sam Cronin were traded by Colorado to Minnesota United FC for Josh Gatt, Mohammed Saeid and an international roster spot.

Burch was released by Minnesota at the end of their 2018 season.

On January 30, 2019, Burch joined USL Championship side Memphis 901 ahead of their inaugural season. He was also named as the club captain.

Honors

D.C. United
Major League Soccer Supporter's Shield (1): 2007
Lamar Hunt U.S. Open Cup (1): 2008

Career statistics

References

External links
 

1984 births
Living people
American soccer players
Evansville Purple Aces men's soccer players
Maryland Terrapins men's soccer players
Cleveland Internationals players
LA Galaxy players
Columbus Crew players
D.C. United players
Seattle Sounders FC players
Colorado Rapids players
Minnesota United FC players
Memphis 901 FC players
Soccer players from Cincinnati
LA Galaxy draft picks
USL League Two players
Major League Soccer players
United States men's youth international soccer players
United States men's under-20 international soccer players
Association football defenders
USL Championship players